Richard J. Dolwig (April 29, 1908 – November 26, 1992) was an American politician who served in the California State Assembly for the 21st and 27th District from 1947 to 1957. He served in the California State Senate from 1957 to 1961. During World War II he also served in the United States Army. He was noted for introducing a 1961 legislative act with Pauline L. Davis and introduced a proposal in 1965 to split California in half.

References

External links
 Guide to the Richard J. Dolwig Collection, 1950-1981

United States Army personnel of World War II
1908 births
1992 deaths
20th-century American politicians
Republican Party members of the California State Assembly
Republican Party California state senators
University of North Dakota alumni
Ohio State University alumni
Stanford University alumni